Curtie and the Boombox were a Dutch pop group that scored two successful hits on the Dutch charts during the mid 1980s. Notable songs include "Black Kisses (Never Make You Blue)" and "Let's Talk it over in the Ladies Room". The former of which also made it on the Billboard Hot 100, peaking at No. 81. Both songs were performed by the group on the Dutch television show TopPop with "Black Kisses" being performed two different times. Lead singer Curtie Fortune passed away in 2003.

Discography

Albums
Black Kisses - 1985
Curtie and the Boombox - 1985

Singles and EP records
"Let's Talk it over in the Ladies Room" - 1984 
"Black Kisses (Never Make You Blue)" - 1985
"Chinchilla" - 1985
"A Bachelor's Bed (Is A Dangerous Place)" - 1985
"Killing Love" - 1986 (released as by Boom Box)

References

External links
Discogs

Dutch pop music groups